Thomas Bower (1838–1919) was an English architect and surveyor based in Nantwich, Cheshire. He worked in partnership with Ernest H. Edleston at the Nantwich firm Bower & Edleston, which he founded in 1854. He is particularly associated with the Gothic Revival style of architecture.

In 1883, Bower was living at 140–142 Hospital Street in Nantwich. In 1914, he and Edleston had offices at Bank Chambers on Churchyard Side in the town square.

Works
Bower's buildings include:
St Philip's Church, Kelsall (1860)
Lamb Hotel (now Chatterton House), Hospital Street, Nantwich (1861)
Spurstow School, Spurstow (1872)
Barclays Bank, 11 Churchyard Side, Nantwich (1876)
Free Library (now Nantwich Museum), Nantwich (1888)
Sandbach Town Hall (1889)
Vicarage, Narrow Lane, Crewe Green (1889)
Remodelling of 148 Hospital Street, Nantwich (1890s)
Petton Hall, Petton, Shropshire 
Biddulph Grange, Biddulph, Staffordshire (1896)
Alterations to Crewe Hall, Crewe Green (1896)
Drinking fountain, Sandbach (1897)

References

Sources
Hall, J. A History of the Town and Parish of Nantwich, or Wich Malbank, in the County Palatine of Chester (2nd ed.) (E. J. Morten, 1972)
Hartwell, Clare; Hyde, Matthew; Edward Hubbard & Nikolaus Pevsner. The Buildings of England: Cheshire (Yale University Press; 2011)
Newman, J. & Pevsner, N. Shropshire (Yale University Press, 2006)
Pevsner, N. & Hubbard, E. The Buildings of England: Cheshire (Penguin, 1971)

1838 births
1919 deaths
19th-century English architects
Architects from Cheshire
People from Nantwich